Miguel Ángel Andreolo Frodella (6 September 1912 – 14 May 1981), known as Michele Andreolo, was a Uruguayan Italian footballer who played as a midfielder. He was born in Dolores, Uruguay but his family was from Valle dell'Angelo in the province of Salerno. He was a member of the Italy team that won the 1938 FIFA World Cup.

Club career
Andreolo played for Nacional in Uruguay before joining Serie A team Bologna F.C. 1909 ahead of the 1935–36 season and helping them win the league title (Scudetto) that year. He would remain in Bologna until 1943, winning the Scudetto three more times, in 1936–37, 1938–39 and 1940–41.

Later in his career he played for Italian sides Lazio, Napoli, Catania and Forlì.

International career
Following his success with Bologna, Andreolo was also called up to the Italy national team by Vittorio Pozzo and debuted on 17 May 1936 against Austria. He soon became a regular in the team, playing his crucial role of connection between defence and attack. He helped win the 1938 FIFA World Cup in France, and played his last match for the national team on 19 April 1942, having earned 26 caps and 1 goal. With Uruguay, he won the 1935 South American Championship.

Death
Andreolo died in Potenza, southern Italy.

Honours

Club
Bologna
Serie A: 1935–36, 1936–37, 1938–39, 1940–41

International
Uruguay
Copa América: 1935

Italy
FIFA World Cup: 1938

Individual
FIFA World Cup All-Star Team: 1938

References

This article is based on a translation of an article from the Italian Wikipedia.

1912 births
1981 deaths
Footballers from Montevideo
Club Nacional de Football players
Bologna F.C. 1909 players
S.S. Lazio players
S.S.C. Napoli players
Catania S.S.D. players
1938 FIFA World Cup players
FIFA World Cup-winning players
Italian footballers
Italy international footballers
Serie A players
Uruguayan footballers
Uruguayan emigrants to Italy
People of Campanian descent
Association football midfielders